The Marist Red Foxes women's basketball team is the basketball team that represents Marist College in Poughkeepsie, New York, United States.  The school's team currently competes in the Metro Atlantic Athletic Conference.

History
The Red Foxes had an 11-year stretch from 2004 to 2015 in which they won 10 conference tournaments (while playing in 12 conference tournaments) and won 11 regular season titles while advancing to the Sweet Sixteen in 2007. In those seasons, they only missed the NCAA Tournament twice (2005 and 2015, though they made the WNIT in the latter year).

NCAA Tournament appearances
The Red Foxes have a 5–11 record in eleven NCAA Tournament appearances.

WNIT appearances
The Red Foxes are 0–2 in WNIT appearances.

Year-by-year results
Division I only

|-
| style="background: #ffffdd; text-align:center;" colspan="6" | Hudson Valley Women's Athletic Conference
|-
|-
| style="background: #e6e6e6; text-align:center;" colspan="6" | Susan Deer (1981–83)
|-

|-
| style="background: #ffffdd; text-align:center;" colspan="6" | Cosmopolitan Conference
|-

|-
| style="background: #e6e6e6; text-align:center;" colspan="6" | Patty Torza (1983–86)
|-

|-
| style="background: #ffffdd; text-align:center;" colspan="6" | ECAC Metro
|-
|-
| style="background: #e6e6e6; text-align:center;" colspan="6" | Ken Babineau (1986–98)
|-

|-
| style="background: #ffffdd; text-align:center;" colspan="6" | Northeast Conference
|-

|-
| style="background: #ffffdd; text-align:center;" colspan="6" | Metro Atlantic Athletic Conference
|-

|-
| style="background: #e6e6e6; text-align:center;" colspan="6" | Kristin Lamb (1998–02)
|-

|-
| style="background: #e6e6e6; text-align:center;" colspan="6" | Brian Giorgis (2002–present)
|-

Records
Active players in italics. *As of March 19, 2021
Note: Free throw percentage list is Min 100 made/2 seasons played

Career scoring leaders

Career rebound leaders

Career assist leaders

Career blocked shots leaders

Career steals leaders

Career three-point leaders

Career free throw pct. leaders

Career free throw leaders

See also
 Marist Red Foxes men's basketball

References

External links